Justice Bernstein may refer to:

Charles C. Bernstein (1904–1976), associate justice of the Arizona Supreme Court
Richard H. Bernstein (born 1974), associate justice of the Michigan Supreme Court